Ethylphosphonoselenoic dichloride is a selenium-containing organophosphorus compound. It's the precursor to selenophos, the selenium analog of the VE nerve agent.

See also
Methylphosphonyl dichloride

References

Organophosphorus compounds
Organoselenium compounds